NH2 or similar may refer to:

 Azanide (chemical formula )
 Amino radical (chemical formula )
 Nitrenium ion (chemical formula )
 Primary amide group (chemical formula )
 National Highway 2 (India)
 New Hampshire's 2nd congressional district